Front is a comune (municipality) in the Metropolitan City of Turin in the Italian region Piedmont, located about  north of Turin.

Front borders the following municipalities: Busano, Favria, Vauda Canavese, Oglianico, San Carlo Canavese, Rivarossa, and San Francesco al Campo.

References

Cities and towns in Piedmont
Canavese